The Oredezh is a river in Volosovsky, Gatchinsky, and Luzhsky Districts in the south-western part of Leningrad Oblast, Russia, a right tributary of the Luga. The principal tributary of the Oredezh is the Suyda (left). A cascade of hydroelectric plants was constructed on the upper course of the river in 1948.

The source of the Oredezh is located in Lake Kyurlevsky Karyer in the eastern part of Volosovsky District. The river flows south and crosses into Gatchinsky District. Upstream of the settlement of Batovo it turns east and flows through the urban-type settlements Siversky and Vyritsa. At the eastern edge of Vyritsa it sharply turns to the south and accepts the Suyda from the left. It further crosses into Luzhsky District and by the selo of Milodezh turns west. The mouth of the Oredezh is at the selo of Ploskoye.

The drainage basin of the Oredezh includes the southern part of Gatchinsky District and the eastern part of Luzhsky District, as well as minor areas in the east of Volosovsky District and in the southwest of Tosnensky District. Urban-type settlements of Siversky, Vyritsa, and Druzhnaya Gorka lie in the basin of the Oredezh. A part of Mshinskoye Boloto Zakaznik lies in the basin of the Oredezh, west of the river course.

References

Rivers of Leningrad Oblast